"Superstar" is a song by Danish-Norwegian electronic music duo Pegboard Nerds and American DJ Nghtmre featuring American electronic dance music band Krewella. It was released on 27 May 2016 by independent electronic record label Monstercat. Prior to release, the song was premiered during a DJ set by Pegboard Nerds and Krewella at the Avalon Hollywood nightclub in early 2016. The song has since received numerous remixes from various artists including Kandy, Olly, and Aero Chord.

Charts

References

2016 songs
Dubstep songs
Krewella songs
Monstercat singles
Nghtmre songs